Agostina Belli (born 13 April 1949) is an Italian film actress. She has appeared in more than 50 films since 1968.

Life and career
Born in Milan as Agostina Maria Magnoni, Belli made her debut in 1968 with a minor part in Bandits in Milan, then appeared in supporting roles in several musicarelli, giallo films and horror of Spanish-Italian co-production. She had her first role of weight in Lina Wertmüller's The Seduction of Mimi, then she was chosen by Dino Risi as the beautiful Sara in Scent of a Woman, for which she won a Grolla d'oro, and the ingenuous Marcella of The Career of a Chambermaid, for which she received a special David di Donatello. In the 1970s, Belli enjoyed a period of strong popularity performing in small productions and comedies of somewhat dubious value, but of great commercial success, from the 1980s onwards she reduced the quantity of her appearances.

She was married to actor Fred Robsahm.

Selected filmography

 Bandits in Milan (1968) - Ragazza in ostaggio
 Il terribile ispettore (1969) - Giorgina Lorenzi
 Safety Catch (1970) - Mara
 Formula 1 - Nell'Inferno del Grand Prix (1970) - Lisa
 Angeli senza paradiso (1970) - Marta
 Scream of the Demon Lover (1970) - Cristiana
 Ma che musica maestro (1971) - Giulietta Ciova
 Faccia da schiaffi (1971)
 The Fifth Cord (1971) - Giulia Soavi
 The Seduction of Mimi (1972) - Rosalia Capuzzo in Mardocheo
 The Eroticist (1972) - Sister Brunhilde
 The Night of the Devils (1972) - Sdenka
 Bluebeard (1972) - Caroline
 La calandria (1972) - Fulvia - wife of Calandro
 I Kiss the Hand (1973) - Mariuccia Ferrante
 Revolver (1973) - Anna Cipriani
 Woman Buried Alive (1973) - Christine
 The Last Snows of Spring (1973) - Veronica
 La governante (1974) - Jana
 Virility (1974) - Cettina
 Il figlio della sepolta viva (1974) - Christine (uncredited)
 Quando l'amore è sensualità (1974)
 Ante Up (1974) - Ines
 Scent of a Woman - Profumo di donna (1974) - Sara
 Il lumacone (1974) - Elisa
 Playing with Fire (1975) - Maria, la servande des Saxe
 The Sex Machine (1975) - Francesca De Renzi
 Due cuori, una cappella (1975) - Claudia Giliberti
 The Career of a Chambermaid (1976) - Marcella Valmarin aka Alba Doris
 The Big Operator (1976) - Amandine
 Cara sposa (1977) - Adelina
 The Purple Taxi (1977) - Anne Taubelman
 Holocaust 2000 (1977) - Sara Golan
 Double Murder (1977) - Teresa Colasanti
 Enfantasme (1978) - Claudia Lanza
 Suggestionata (1978)
 Manaos (1979) - Claudia
 La guérilléra (1982) - Caterina
 Vai avanti tu che mi vien da ridere (1982) - Andrea Maria Ritter
 A Strange Passion (1984) - Zaveria
 Torna (1984) - Angela
 Una donna da scoprire (1987) - Michela
 Soldati - 365 all'alba (1987) - Anna Fili
 Happy end (1989)
 L'urlo della verità (1992) - Roberto's mother, Elli (uncredited)
 One Out of Two (2006) - Elena, Tresy's mother
 Amore che vieni, amore che vai (2008) - Lina - madre di Carlo

References

External links

1949 births
Living people
Italian film actresses
Actresses from Milan
David di Donatello winners